Walter Brookes Spong (1851 - 2 March 1929 ) was an English stage and watercolor painter.

Spong was born in London. He married Elizabeth Twedle, and their daughter, Hilda (1875–1955), was an actress in theatre and movies, working in Australia, Europe, and America. Spong was a friend of noted Australian artists Tom Roberts, and Arthur Streeton.

In 1886, Spong moved to Australia, and became the chief scene painter with the Brough and Boucicault Comedy Company (may have accompanied them to Australia). In 1886, he was one of the founders of the  Australian Artists' Association and the Victorian Art Society.

In 1898, Spong returned to England. In 1900, he was listed as a stage painter in the records of the Royal Adelphi Theatre of London.

Spong died in 1929 in Nice, France.

Exhibitions of his works
His works have been exhibited at the Royal Art Society of New South Wales, Victorian Artist's Society (Australia), Society of Artists (Australia), Royal Institute of Watercolour Painters, Royal Academy (8) and Walker Gallery (66) in London, among others.

His works are represented in the Australian National Gallery, Canberra, the Art Gallery of New South Wales, The Manly Art Gallery, The Mitchell Library, Sydney, and The Dixon Galleries, as well as corporate and private collections in Australia, the United Kingdom, and the United States.

Further reading

Notes

1851 births
1929 deaths
19th-century English painters
20th-century English painters
English male painters
English watercolourists
Australian painters
Australian scenic designers
Painters from London
20th-century English male artists
19th-century English male artists